The welfare state of Sri Lanka began to evolve in the 1930s through to the 1970s, and comprises expenditures by the government of Sri Lanka intended to improve health, education, employment and social security. The Sri Lankan system has been classified as a liberal welfare state system.

See also 

 Social welfare
 Welfare reform

Housing:
 Public housing
 Housing estate
 Council house

References 

Taxation in Sri Lanka
Social security in Sri Lanka
Child welfare in Sri Lanka